The Flight of Mr. McKinley is a 1975 Soviet science fiction film directed by Mikhail Schweitzer.

Plot
A scientist invents the colloid gas — a creation that allows a person to hibernate for a hundred and more years, and wake up in almost the same physical state as when he was falling asleep.

The colloid gas is immediately used for commercial purposes by Sam Boulder, who creates a Salvatory system; secret deep underground, well-equipped storage facilities for those people who want to go to the future - fleeing from an incurable disease, boredom, the threat of nuclear war, or simply because of the desire to "remain an eternal champion".

McKinley is a small man, a clerk in one of the advertising bureaus - he is very fond of children but his dreams of having his own are hampered by an inferiority complex, which manifests itself as a fear of nuclear armageddon and a world catastrophe. McKinley seeks to escape from the outside world and himself.

Once at the press conference of SBS, which creates and maintains a network of salvatories, McKinley draws the attention of one of the top managers of this firm and receives an invitation to visit one of the salvatories to get acquainted with his work. After that, Mr. McKinley, fascinated by the fantastic technology of the salvatories, has only one dream in life - to get into the salvatory and escape to the future. For this, he is even ready to commit the crime.

He attempts several times to get rich to buy a treasured ticket to a salvatory but always ends up failing. At the last moment, McKinley finds a winning lottery ticket, which has the amount required to purchase the ticket.

The fantasy comes faithful - McKinley sleeps for 250 years to wake up later clean, shaved and washed ready to go out into the new world. He does not pay attention to the strange behaviour of the hateful and contempt employees of SBS, who are performing their duties strictly according to the instructions. The elevator takes McKinley to the surface of the Earth but instead of a flowering garden, a world scorched by endless wars waits for him.

But all this turns out to be only a dream. McKinley did not leave his time period, and he acts as he never did before to cure his complexes.

Cast
Donatas Banionis — Mr. McKinley (voiced by Zinovy Gerdt)
Zhanna Bolotova — Miss Bettle
Angelina Stepanova — Mrs. Ann Shamway
Boris Babochkin — billionaire Sam Boulder
Alla Demidova — loose woman
Vladimir Vysotsky — street singer Bill Seeger
Alexander Vokach — Barens
Sofya Garrel Madame — Coquillon
Leonid Kuravlyov — Mr. Droot
Tatyana Lavrova— Mrs. Perkins
Victor Sergachev — Jacques-Paul Coquillon
Vladimir Kenigson — episode
Olga Barnet — Miss Kathy Benson
Yuri Volyntsev — McKinley's colleague
Igor Kvasha — director of SB-Salvatory
Igor Kashintsev — Parkins

Production

Film score
Schweitzer, in the process of reworking Leonov's script so that it would be more suited for the present time, decided to express the author's idea through songs.

Since the film was made in the American style, the idea arose to use the method of end-to-end ballads widely used in American films. The option of inviting Dean Reed was considered, however, Schweitzer's wife came up with the idea of hiring Vladimir Vysotsky.

Vysotsky wrote the ballads, but they were mostly unsuitable for the picture because of their excessive length. Composer of the film's score Schwartz refused to write his own ballads which was why some songs were written by Anatoly Kalvarsky.

Location
Outdoor scenes of the film were mostly shot in Budapest.

References

External links

Soviet science fiction drama films
1970s science fiction drama films
Films directed by Mikhail Shveytser
Mosfilm films
Films shot in Budapest
Films set in the 1970s
Films set in Europe
Films set in the 23rd century